Sutton Coldfield Rugby Club is an English rugby union team based in Sutton Coldfield, West Midlands. The club runs four senior sides, a ladies team, a veterans team and a full range of junior teams. The first XV currently plays in Midlands 1 West, the sixth tier of the English rugby union system.

Club honours

1st XV:
Midlands 1 West champions (2): 1988–89, 2011–12
Midlands West 1 champions: 1993–94
Midlands 3 West (South) champions: 2007–08

Youth:
(U14) North Midlands Cup champions: 2015–16

Notes

References

External links
Official club website

English rugby union teams
Rugby clubs established in 1921
Sport in Birmingham, West Midlands